The 2016 Oceania Rugby Under 20 Championship, was the second edition of the Oceania Rugby Junior Championship. It was played as two tournaments; the Oceania Under 20 Championship hosted on the Gold Coast in Australia, and the Oceania Under 20 Trophy hosted in Suva.

The Championship was played in May, with New Zealand defeating Australia by 30–10 in the first match of the tournament. Australia won the second match by 25–24 to draw the series one-all, but New Zealand took the championship due to superior points difference. The Trophy competition was played in December and won by Fiji, who defeated Tonga by 18–13 in the last round to qualify for the World Rugby Under 20 Trophy in 2017.

Teams
The teams for the 2016 Oceania Rugby Under 20 tournaments were:

Championship

Trophy

Championship

Round 1

Round 2

Trophy

Standings
Final competition table:
{| class="wikitable" style="text-align:center;"
|-
!width=175 |Team
!width=25 abbr="Played" |Pld
!width=25 abbr="Won" |W
!width=25 abbr="Drawn" |D
!width=25 abbr="Lost" |L
!width=32 abbr="Points for" |PF
!width=32 abbr="Points against" |PA
!width=32 abbr="Points difference" |PD
!width=25 abbr="Points" |Pts
|- bgcolor=ccffcc
|align=left|
| 2|| 2||0 ||0 ||68 ||16 ||+52 ||9
|-
|align=left|
| 2|| 1||0 ||1 ||63 ||30 ||+33 ||6
|-
|align=left|
| 2|| 0||0 ||2 ||15 ||100 ||−85 ||0
|-
|colspan="15"|
|}

References

External links
Oceania Rugby website 

2016
2016 rugby union tournaments for national teams
2016 in Oceanian rugby union
2016 in Australian rugby union
2016 in New Zealand rugby union
Sports competitions on the Gold Coast, Queensland
2016 in youth sport
International rugby union competitions hosted by Australia